Brian Taylor (2 July 1944 – 7 December 2013) was an English professional footballer who played as a full back.

Career
Born in Hammersmith, Taylor played for Queens Park Rangers and Romford.

References

1944 births
2013 deaths
English footballers
Queens Park Rangers F.C. players
Romford F.C. players
English Football League players
Association football fullbacks